The 1957 Big Ten Conference football season was the 62nd season of college football played by the member schools of the Big Ten Conference (also known as the Western Conference) and was a part of the 1957 NCAA University Division football season.

The 1957 Ohio State Buckeyes football team, under head coach Woody Hayes, won the conference championship with a 7-0 conference record (9–1 record overall), was ranked No. 1 in the final Coaches' Poll, and defeated Oregon in the 1958 Rose Bowl. The Buckeyes were ranked No.2 in the final AP Poll, but were also declared national champion by the FWAA poll. Ohio State back Don Clark led the conference with 737 rushing yards. Guard Aurealius Thomas was a first-team All-American.

The 1957 Michigan State Spartans football team, under head coach Duffy Daugherty, compiled an 8–1 record and was ranked No. 3 in the final AP and UPI polls. Michigan State back Walt Kowalczyk and center Dan Currie were selected as consensus first-team All-Americans. Kowalczyk led the conference with 54 points scored, and Currie was selected as the team's most valuable player.

The 1957 Iowa Hawkeyes football team, under head coach Forest Evashevski, finished third in the Big Ten with a 7–1–1 record and was ranked No. 8 in the final AP Poll. Iowa tackle Alex Karras was a consensus first-team All-American and won the Outland Trophy as the best interior lineman in college football. Quarterback Randy Duncan led the Big Ten with 1,124 passing yards and 1,183 total yards.

Michigan halfback Jim Pace won the Chicago Tribune Silver Football trophy as the conference's most valuable player.

Season overview

Results and team statistics

Key
AP final = Team's rank in the final AP Poll of the 1957 season
AP high = Team's highest rank in the AP Poll throughout the 1957 season
PPG = Average of points scored per game
PAG = Average of points allowed per game
MVP = Most valuable player as voted by players on each team as part of the voting process to determine the winner of the Chicago Tribune Silver Football trophy; trophy winner in bold

Preseason

Regular season

Bowl games

Statistical leaders

The Big Ten's individual statistical leaders include the following:

Passing yards
1. Randy Duncan, Iowa (1,124)
2. Jim Ninowski, Michigan State (718)
3. Tom Haller, Illinois	(675)
4. Jim Van Pelt, Michigan (629)
5. Tom McDonald, Indiana (544)

Rushing yards
1. Don Clark, Ohio State (737)
2. Jim Pace, Michigan (664)
3. Bob White, Ohio State (645)
4. Danny Lewis, Wisconsin (611)
5. Walt Kowalczyk, Michigan State (545)

Receiving yards
1. Jim Gibbons, Iowa (587)
2. Dave Whitsell, Indiana (290)
3. Dave Kaiser, Michigan State (267)
4. Sam Williams, Michigan State (236)
5. Gary Prahst, Michigan (233)

Total yards
1. Randy Duncan, Iowa (1,183)
2. Don Clark, Ohio State (788)
3. Tom Haller, Illinois (724)
4. Sidney Williams, Wisconsin (661)
5. Jim Pace, Michigan (656)

Point scored
1. Walt Kowalczyk, Michigan State (54)
1. Jim Pace, Michigan (54)
1. Don Clark, Ohio State (54)
4. Frank Kremblas, Ohio State (48)
4. Dick LeBeau, Ohio State (48)

Awards and honors

All-Big Ten honors

The following players were picked by the Associated Press (AP) and/or the United Press (UP) as first-team players on the 1957 All-Big Ten Conference football team.

All-American honors

At the end of the 1957 season, Big Ten players secured three of the consensus first-team picks for the 1957 College Football All-America Team. The Big Ten's consensus All-American was:

Other Big Ten players who were named first-team All-Americans by at least one selector were:

Other awards

Iowa tackle Alex Karras won the Outland Trophy as the best interior lineman in college football.

The Heisman Trophy was awarded to John David Crow of Texas A&M.  Three Big Ten players finished among the top 10 in the voting for the trophy. They were: defensive lineman Alex Karras of Iowa (second); running back Walt Kowalczyk of Michigan State; and offensive lineman Dan Currie of Michigan State.

1958 NFL Draft
The following Big Ten players were among the first 100 picks in the 1958 NFL Draft:

References